High affinity immunoglobulin epsilon receptor subunit beta is a protein that in humans is encoded by the MS4A2 gene.

Function
The allergic response involves the binding of allergen to receptor-bound IgE followed by cell activation and the release of mediators responsible for the manifestations of allergy. The IgE-receptor, a tetramer composed of an alpha, beta, and 2 disulfide-linked gamma chains, is found on the surface of mast cells and basophils. This gene encodes the beta subunit of the high affinity IgE receptor which is a member of the membrane-spanning 4A gene family. Members of this nascent protein family are characterized by common structural features and similar intron/exon splice boundaries and display unique expression patterns among hematopoietic cells and nonlymphoid tissues. This family member is localized to 11q12, among a cluster of family members.

See also
 FcεRI

References

Further reading

Fc receptors